Thomas John Messitt (July 27, 1874 – September 22, 1934), was a Major League Baseball catcher for the 1899 Louisville Colonels.

External links

1874 births
1934 deaths
Major League Baseball catchers
Baseball players from Philadelphia
Louisville Colonels players
19th-century baseball players
Springfield Ponies players
Springfield Maroons players
Amsterdam Red Stockings players
Troy Trojans (minor league) players
Wheeling Nailers (baseball) players
Auburn Maroons players
Syracuse Stars (minor league baseball) players
Wilkes-Barre Coal Barons players
Schenectady Electricians players
Kansas City Blues (baseball) players
Kansas City Blue Stockings players
Colorado Springs Millionaires players
Pueblo Indians players
Montgomery Senators players
Richmond Colts players